Legacy is a 2004 album by The Temptations for the Motown label, introducing new Temptations G.C. Cameron and Joe Herndon. The album was the group's final release on Motown; they left the label shortly after its release. "Somethin' Special" was a Top 40 hit on the Urban Adult Contemporary Charts peaking at #25. The cover photograph was taken by Aaron Rapoport.

Track listing
"Still Temptin'" (Balewa Muhammad, Frank Oliphant, Steve Harvey, Thomas Olivera) - 4:35
"Round Here" (Muhammad, Bobby Watson, Clifton Lighty, Oliphant, Harvey) - 4:00
"Stay Together" (Andrew Ramsey, Eric Benét, Shannon Sanders) - 4:29
"Somethin' Special" (Brian Winsley, Dinky Bingham, Joel Kipnis, LaMenga Kafi) - 4:46
"Fifty Fifty Love" (Carlton Grant, Dave Evans, Steve Lindsey) - 3:43
"Love To The Music" (Daniel Weatherspoon) - 4:48
"You Are Necessary In My Life (The Wedding Song)" (Benjamin Wright, Otis Williams) - 6:36
"Mr. Fix It" (Muhammad, Oliphant, Mary Brown, Harvey) - 4:47
"All The Wrong People" (Muhammad, Watson, Oliphant, Brown, Harvey) - 4:46
"Baby It's Me" (Grant, Evans, Lindsey) - 5:18
"Why Can't We Be Lovin' Friends" (Ali-Ollie Woodson, Williams) - 5:54 with Danesha Simon
"Never Let You Down" (Arlene Britt, Johnny Britt) - 3:49

Personnel
The Temptations 
G.C. Cameron – tenor vocals
Terry Weeks – tenor/baritone vocals
Otis Williams – tenor/baritone vocals
Ron Tyson – first tenor/falsetto vocals
Joe Herndon – bass vocals

References

2004 albums
The Temptations albums
Motown albums